Bustubayevo (Buśtıbay) is a rural locality (a village) in Nukayevsky Selsoviet, Kugarchinsky District, Bashkortostan, Russia. The population was 83 as of 2010. There are 2 streets.

Geography 
Bustubayevo is located 30 km south of Mrakovo (the district's administrative centre) by road. 1-ye Tukatovo is the nearest rural locality.

References 

Rural localities in Kugarchinsky District